Velocity of Sound is the fifth studio album by The Apples in Stereo, released in October 2002. The American release has an orange album cover, while the European version is green and the Japanese version is blue. The bonus track is also different for each version.

The album is somewhat louder and more aggressive than the band's four previous studio albums with more emphasis on electric instruments (such as the distorted sounds of an electric guitar) than acoustic. The album was recorded between January 2 - June 6, 2002 at Pet Sounds Recording Studio in Denver, Colorado on 8-track and 16-track tape machines as well as an electronic computer.

Track listing
All tracks written by Robert Schneider except where noted.

"Please" – 2:29
"Rainfall" (lyrics by Robert Schneider, music by Hilarie Sidney) – 2:44
"That's Something I Do" – 2:28
"Do You Understand?" – 3:22
"Where We Meet" – 2:52
"Yore Days" (Eric Allen) – 2:03
"Better Days" – 2:29
"I Want" (Hilarie Sidney) – 2:03
"Mystery" – 3:10
"Baroque" – 3:21

Bonus tracks
American release
"She's Telling Lies (Bryce's Mix)" – 1:51
European release
"She's Telling Lies (Robert's Mix)" – 1:42
Japanese release
"Other" – 2:19

Personnel 
The Apples in Stereo
Eric Allen - bass guitar, backing vocals, lead vocals on track 6
John Hill - rhythm guitar, backing vocals
Robert Schneider - lead and backing vocals, lead guitar, synthesizer, percussion
Hilarie Sidney - drums, percussion, backing vocals, lead vocals on tracks 2 and 8

Additional
Chris McDuffie - organ, backing vocals
Dan Efram - percussion, repercussion
Bryce Goggin - percussion

Production
Robert Schneider - production, mixing (tracks 5, 6, 7 and 9)
The Apples in Stereo, Jim McIntyre - engineering
Bryce Goggin - mixing (tracks 1, 2, 3, 4, 8, 10 and 11)
Emily Lazar - mastering
Dan Efram - package concept and design

References

2002 albums
The Apples in Stereo albums
SpinART Records albums
The Elephant 6 Recording Company albums